Kapotnya District  is an administrative district (raion) of South-Eastern Administrative Okrug, and one of the 125 raions of Moscow, Russia.

Kapotnya is best known as the site of Moscow oil refinery, one of the few remaining industrial facilities within Moscow proper (since most others were moved to less populous areas for ecological reasons). The refinery claims minimizing environmental risks as its priority.

See also
Administrative divisions of Moscow

References

Notes

Sources

Districts of Moscow